Hureemey Inthizaarugaa (English translation: I waited)  is a 2005 Maldivian romantic drama film directed by Abdul Faththaah. Co-produced by Malla Ahmed Nasir and Ahmed Arif under Apollo Entertainments, the film stars Ravee Farooq, Mariyam Zuhura and Waleedha Waleed in pivotal roles. The film was heavily relied on the effect of the 2004 Indian Ocean earthquake on the Maldives.

Plotline
Shafiu (Ravee Farooq), who was adopted in childhood and the most beloved son in his family, visits an island for a survey and meets Reena (Mariyam Zuhura) with whom he connects after several quarrels in prior meetings. Shafiu marries Reena and is blessed with two children. Before his adoptive father Qafoor's death, he was willed to be promoted as the company head and sole owner of his property. However, upon his death, Shafiu's brother, Ubaid (Ibrahim Jihad), strips him of all of his power, throws his family out of the house and fires him from his post at the company. Until Shafiu finds a decent job and settles in, Reena goes to her island with their children while Shafiu has an extramarital affair with a rich older woman, Nasheedha (Waleedha Waleed).

Cast 
 Ravee Farooq as Shafiu
 Mariyam Zuhura as Reena
 Waleedha Waleed as Nasheedha
 Ibrahim Jihad as Ubaid
 Nadhiya Hassan as Muna; Reena's best friend
 Fauziyya Hassan as Manike; Reena's mother
 Chilhiya Moosa Manik as Mannan; Reena's father
 Mohamed Faisal as Fakhir
 Satthar Ibrahim Manik as Office Boss
 Ibrahim Wisan as a company staff
 Aminath Shareef as Nasheedha's friend
 Neena Saleem as Aishath Shirmeena
 Fathimath Fareela (special appearance in the item song "Bunedheyshey Mithura")

Soundtrack

Accolades

References

External links 
 

Maldivian romantic drama films
2005 romantic drama films
2005 films
Films directed by Abdul Faththaah
Dhivehi-language films